Kumkan Peak is a  mountain summit located in British Columbia, Canada.

Description
The nearest neighbor is Kwoiek Peak 2.35 km (1.46 mi) to the northwest and the nearest higher neighbor is Skihist Mountain,  to the north. Meltwater from the Kwoiek Glacier on the north slope drains into  Kwoiek Creek, thence Fraser River, and precipitation runoff from the peak's south slope drains into headwaters of Mehatl Creek → Nahatlatch River → Fraser River. The first ascent of the summit was made August 16, 1958, by four members of the British Columbia Mountaineering Club: Dick Culbert, Art Dellow, Roy Mason, and Ralph Hutchinson.

Etymology
The mountain's name is the traditional name for "head", presumably a reference to the peak's position at the head of the Kwoiek Creek watershed. The toponym was officially adopted on April 3, 1950, by the Geographical Names Board of Canada.

Climate
Based on the Köppen climate classification, Kumkan Peak is located in a subarctic climate zone of western North America. Most weather fronts originate in the Pacific Ocean, and travel east toward the Coast Mountains where they are forced upward by the range (Orographic lift), causing them to drop their moisture in the form of rain or snowfall. As a result, the Coast Mountains experience high precipitation, especially during the winter months in the form of snowfall. Winter temperatures can drop below −20 °C with wind chill factors below −30 °C. This climate supports the Kwoiek Glacier on the north slope of the peak. The months July through September offer the most favorable weather for climbing Kumkan Peak.

See also
Geography of British Columbia

Gallery

References

External links
 Weather: Kumkan Peak

Two-thousanders of British Columbia
Pacific Ranges
Kamloops Division Yale Land District
Coast Mountains
Lillooet Ranges